The "Debate between bird and fish" is an essay written in the Sumerian language on clay tablets, dating back to the mid to late 3rd millennium BC.

Seven "debate" topics are known from Sumerian literature, falling in the category of 'disputations'; some examples are: The Debate between Winter and Summer; Debate between sheep and grain; the Tree and the Reed; bird and fish; and The Dispute between Silver and Mighty Copper, etc. These appeared some centuries after writing was established in Sumerian Mesopotamia. The debates are philosophical and address humanity's place in the world.

Some of the debates may be from 2100 BC.

The bird and fish debate is a 190-line text of cuneiform script. It begins with a discussion of the gods having given Mesopotamia and dwelling places for humans; for water for the fields, the Tigris and Euphrates Rivers, and the marshes, marshland, grazing lands for humans, and the birds of the marshes, and fish are all given.

The debate then begins starting with Fish addressing Bird.

The debate, in short summary

Fish speaks first
The initial speech of Fish:
...Bird...there is no insult, ..! Croaking ...noise in the marshes ...squawking! Forever gobbling away greedily, while your heart is dripping with evil! Standing on the plain you can keep pecking away until they chase you off! The farmer's sons lay lines and nets for you..(and continues)..You cause damage in the vegetable plots..(more)..Bird, you are shameless: you fill the courtyard with your droppings. The courtyard sweeper-boy who cleans the house chases after you...(etc)

The 2nd and 3rd paragraphs continue:
They bring you into the fattening shed. They let you moo like cattle, bleat like sheep. They pour out cool water in jugs for you. They drag you away for the daily sacrifice. (the 2nd, 3rd paragraphs continue for several lines)

Bird's initial retort
Bird replies:
How has your heart become so arrogant, while you yourself are so lowly? Your mouth is flabby(?), but although your mouth goes all the way round, you can not see behind you. You are bereft of hips, as also of arms, hands and feet – try bending your neck to your feet! Your smell is awful; you make people throw-up; they sneer at you!...

Bird continues:
But I am the beautiful and clever Bird! Fine artistry went into my adornment. But no skill has been expended on your holy shaping! Strutting about in the royal palace is my glory; my warbling is considered a decoration in the courtyard. The sound I produce, in all its sweetness, is a delight for the person of Shulgi, son of Enlil...

Šulgi rules in favor of Bird
After the initial speech and retort, Fish attacks Bird's nest. Battle ensues between the two of them, in more words. Near the end Bird requests that Culgi decide in Bird's favor:

Šulgi proclaims:
To strut about in the E-kur is a glory for Bird, as its singing is sweet. At Enlil's holy table, Bird ...precedence over you...!

(lacuna)...Bird ...Because Bird was victorious over Fish in the dispute between Fish and Bird, Father Enki be praised!-(end of line 190, final line)

See also
List of Sumerian debates

References

Kramer, Samuel Noah. The Sumerians: Their History, Culture and Character, Chicago, 1963, 217-222.
Vanstiphout, Herman L.J. and Alster, Bendt.  Bird and Fish. A Sumerian Debate and Fable, or: The Importance of Being Pleasant. Groningen/Philadelphia/Copenhagen, 1988-96..

External links

The Debate between Bird and Fish at ETSCL–(translation)
transliteration text-190 lines, ETCSL
190-line text translation - Includes one extended paragraph summary of Debate

Sumerian disputations
Clay tablets